Wage transparency, salary compensation, and compensation transparency generally, involves disclosure of employee compensation amounts, either among other employees in an organization, to owners, to government regulators, or to the public.

Some jurisdictions have pay transparency laws intended to prevent discrimination based on demographics like gender or race. These laws require job listings to give a salary range for the position. To eliminate unintentional discrimination and treat employees more ethically, some organizations have adopted radical transparency, disclosing all employees' compensation internally and either equalizing pay for similar positions or justifying differences.

Some jurisdictions mandate disclosure of executive compensation to shareholders, in an attempt to reduce excessive compensation.

In the United States, the National Labor Relations Act protects the right of employees to discuss compensation without retaliation from their employer.

New 2023 Laws Regarding Compensation Transparency 
California: California's amended labor code requires companies with over 15 employees required to post compensation on job advertisements. This includes 3rd party companies that aid in hiring such as LinkedIn or Indeed. This amendment also allows current employers to request the pay scale for their current occupation. This law came into effect on the first of the year (2023).

See also
 Equal pay for equal work#Transparency laws

References

Transparency (behavior)
Wages and salaries